Kosmos 2196 ( meaning Cosmos 2196) is a Russian US-K missile early warning satellite which was launched in 1992 as part of the Russian Space Forces' Oko programme. The satellite is designed to identify missile launches using optical telescopes and infrared sensors.

Kosmos 2196 was launched from Site 43/3 at Plesetsk Cosmodrome in Russia. A Molniya-M carrier rocket with a 2BL upper stage was used to perform the launch, which took place at 09:53 UTC on 8 July 1992. The launch successfully placed the satellite into a molniya orbit. It subsequently received its Kosmos designation, and the international designator 1992-040A. The United States Space Command assigned it the Satellite Catalog Number 22189.

See also

List of Kosmos satellites (2001–2250)
List of R-7 launches (1990–1994)
1992 in spaceflight
List of Oko satellites

References

Kosmos satellites
Spacecraft launched in 1992
Oko
Spacecraft launched by Molniya-M rockets